Events from the year 1650 in France.

Incumbents 
Monarch: Louis XIV
Regent: Anne of Austria

Events
 
 
 
 
 
 
 Jews are allowed to return to France and England.

Births
 

 
 October 9 – René Auguste Constantin de Renneville, French writer (d. 1723)
 December 25 – Claude Aveneau, French missionary (d. 1711)

Deaths

See also

References

1650s in France